Mersen, previously called Carbone Lorraine, is a French international company in electrical power and advanced materials. In 1937, the company was admitted to Bourse de Paris.

History

Mersen, previously named Carbone Lorraine (until May 20, 2010), was created in 1891 by the Compagnie lorraine de charbons pour l’électricité in Pagny-sur-Moselle (Lorraine), where the Group still owns a plant. In 1937, it merged with Le Carbone, a company based in Gennevilliers, (Hauts-de-Seine) where the Group kept and operated the original plant. La Compagnie lorraine de charbons pour l’électricité was founded in Meurthe-et-Moselle in1891. It first manufactured motors, dynamos and lighting lamps before producing « carbons » for electric lighting. At the same time, Le Carbone, founded in 1892 in Paris, produced brushes for electric motors. In 1893, Charles Street, an engineer at Le Carbone, discovered and patented the process of carbon graphitization which allowed the manufacture of synthetic graphite. He patented his idea under the title « Continuous electric furnace system »
During the 80s, Groupe Pechiney acquired a majority stake (61 percent) in Carbone Lorraine and financed an expansion and diversification process. The company expanded beyond its core production of graphite brushes, starting to manufacture carbon–carbon disc brakes for racing motorcycles and developing specific components for nuclear and aerospace industries

In addition, it acquired a number of competitors such as Ferraz, one of the biggest manufacturers of fuses and electrical protection systems. Then, it took the control of Stackpole, which led it to become one of the world leaders in graphite production.

In 1995, Pechiney sold 21% of its stake to Paribas Affaires Industrielles (PAI). In the following years, Carbone Lorraine strengthened its position by making acquisitions in Europe and in the United States, in particular in 1999 the acquisition of the Gould-Shawmut Protection Electrique division; enabling it to become a leader in power semiconductor protection. Paribas sold its Carbone Lorraine shares on the market in 2005.

In May 2010, the General Shareholders' Meeting approved the change of name of the group proposed by management. Carbone Lorraine became Mersen. This name is a tribute to Marin Mersenne, a 17th-century mathematician and philosopher, and is also the acronym for Material, Electrical, Research, Sustainable, Energy.

Luc Themelin is Mersen’s Chief Executive Officer since May 11, 2016. He joined Mersen in 1993 as a Research and Development engineer,. In 2018, the Group announced having won a contract with Longi, one of the Group’s historical partners in the solar market in China. In 2020, Mersen announced the signature of a long-term agreement with the Marquardt Group. In 2021, Mersen announced the signing of an order worth more than 2 million euros with RongXin Power Electronic. That year, Mersen also announced a strategic technical partnership with Soitec to develop a new family of silicon carbide substrates for the electric vehicle market,.

Acquisitions

Activities and markets 
Mersen provides its products and solutions to many markets like the renewable energies (solar, wind), the semi-conductors, the electric vehicles, or the railways. To this end, the group is structured around two segments. The Advanced Materials segment which develops equipment and technologies for high temperature resistance, protection against corrosion, and Electric Power Transfer. The other segment focuses on the Electrical Power with power conversion and equipment and people protection.

Global footprint 

Mersen has 53 manufacturing sites in 35 countries on five continents: 22 sites in Europe, 13 in North America and Asia-Pacific and 5 in South America and Africa. The Group has also 18 R&D centers. 

The percentage of the 2021 turnover of 923 M€ by region is: 34.5% in Europe, 32.5% in North America, 30% in Asia Pacific, 3% in South America and Africa.

Shareholder 
List of major shareholders as of October 30, 2021.

References

Manufacturing companies of France
Companies listed on Euronext Paris